Dorothy Dalton (1 August 1922 – 9 May 1973) was an American gymnast who competed in the 1948 Summer Olympics and in the 1952 Summer Olympics.

References

1922 births
1973 deaths
American female artistic gymnasts
Gymnasts at the 1948 Summer Olympics
Gymnasts at the 1952 Summer Olympics
Olympic bronze medalists for the United States in gymnastics
Medalists at the 1948 Summer Olympics
20th-century American women
20th-century American people